The 2016 Thurrock Council election took place on 5 May 2016 to elect members of Thurrock Council in England. This was on the same day as other local elections.

The council remained under no overall control. The Labour leader of the council, John Kent, resigned at the subsequent annual meeting of the council. The leader of the Conservative group, Rob Gledhill, was elected leader of the council instead.

Results Summary

Overall results
At the previous election the composition of the council was:

After the election the composition of the council was:

I - Independent

Ward results

Aveley & Uplands

Belhus

Chadwell St Mary

Chafford & North Stifford

Corringham & Fobbing

East Tilbury

Grays Riverside

Grays Thurrock

Little Thurrock Blackshots

Ockendon

Orsett

South Chafford

Stanford East & Corringham Town

Stanford-le-Hope West

The Homesteads

Tilbury St Chads

West Thurrock & South Stifford

Subsequent changes between 2016 and 2018 elections
All 17 UKIP councillors left the party in January 2018 to form Thurrock Independents.

References

2016 English local elections
2016
2010s in Essex